Van Hulten is a Dutch surname. Notable people with the surname include:

Michel van Hulten (born 1930), Dutch politician
Michiel van Hulten (born 1969), Dutch politician, son of Michel

Dutch-language surnames